The Jefferson County Courthouse in Port Townsend, Washington was built in 1892.  It was listed on the National Register of Historic Places in 1973.  It was designed by architect W.A. Ritchie and is Romanesque Revival in style.

References

External links

Courthouses on the National Register of Historic Places in Washington (state)
Romanesque Revival architecture in Washington (state)
Government buildings completed in 1892
Jefferson County, Washington